"The Five Sided Triangle" is the 13th and finale television play episode of the second season of the Australian anthology television series Australian Playhouse. "The Five Sided Triangle" was written by Brian Faull. and originally aired on ABC on 16 October 1967 in Sydney

Plot
Mr Caradoc finds that the eternal triangle contains problems of unexpected dimensions. He is a business executive who divides his time between his wife and three mistresses.

Cast
 Raymond Westwell as Mr. Caradoc

Reception
The Age said "it had a confidence, a sureness missing in the other productions of this lamentable series."

Actor Gordon Chater wrote a letter of complaint to the Australian Broadcasting Control Board about the show calling it a "parade of pornography".

See also
 List of live television plays broadcast on ABC (1950–1969)

References

External links
 
 
 

1967 television plays
1967 Australian television episodes
1960s Australian television plays
Australian Playhouse (season 2) episodes
Black-and-white television episodes